Kharkhorin Airport   is a public airport located in Kharkhorin, a sum (district) center in the Övörkhangai Province of Mongolia.

Overview
The airport is located 4 km north of the town. There is a small passenger terminal building at the northeast side of apron but it is reported that there are virtually no passenger or cargo handling facilities.

See also 
 List of airports in Mongolia

External links 
world airport codes Kharkhorin
Civil Aviation Authority of Mongolia Kharkhorin

Airports in Mongolia